is a Japanese announcer and former model who is represented by the talent agency Horipro. She was an announcer for Nippon Television.

Filmography (during NTV)

Filmography (as a free announcer)

Drama

References

External links
 Official profile 
  
 Profile at Macaroni Ammonit 
 Profile at Sportiva 

Japanese announcers
Japanese gravure idols
1980 births
Living people
People from Tokyo